Vanderhall Motor Works is an American vehicle manufacturer based in Provo, Utah. It manufactures hand-made three-wheeled autocycles designed for sports driving, touring, commuting and city driving.

History

Vanderhall Motor Works was founded in 2010 by Steve Hall. Hall, who had been a CAD designer at Novatek, spent five years prototyping before offering his designs to the public.  His initial model was the Laguna: a three-wheel roadster that is federally classified as a motorcycle and passed final testing for NHTSA and EPA certification in 2016. In 2016, Vanderhall officially produced three autocycle models: Laguna, Laguna Sport Premium, and the Laguna Bespoke Motoring Experience. Each features a 1.4-liter, turbocharged GM Family 0 engine with a GM 6-speed automatic transmission.

Models

Laguna

Vanderhall Motor Works announced in 2012 a two-seat vehicle, a kind of three-wheeled sports car that has been in production since 2016.

Venice

The Venice was presented in 2017 with ABS bodywork.

Edison 2

Electric version of the model Venice.

Venice Speedster

In 2018, Vanderhall announced a Speedster model at the annual Sturgis Rally.

Carmel

The 2019  Carmel is Vanderhall’s latest  release.

Brawley

Quad motor electric off-roader.

References

External links
 Official page

Three-wheeled motor vehicles
2010 establishments in Utah
American companies established in 2010
Companies based in Provo, Utah
Motor vehicle manufacturers of the United States
Manufacturing companies based in Utah